{{DISPLAYTITLE:C15H14O}}
The molecular formula C15H14O may refer to:

 1,1-Diphenylacetone
 Dibenzyl ketone
 Dihydrochalcone
 Flavan, a backbone of certain flavonoids
 Isoflavan, a backbone found in isoflavanes
 Neoflavan

Molecular formulas